The United States Army Ambulance Service (USAAS) was a unit of the United States Army during World War I.  It was established by General Order No. 75 of the War Department in May 1917.  It primarily provided medical services to the French, British and Italian Armies during the first World War. In the second World War, the unit aided the British and the Italians.  It incorporated the volunteer sections of the American Field Service, which had been formed before the American entry into World War I.

Structure
Each section was composed of approximately "45 men, 20 Ford ambulances, 1 Ford touring car, 1 truck, and a kitchen trailer." The number of officers peaked at 209 officers in November 1918 and in the course of demobilization was reduced to 3 in July 1920. It was organized into 160 sections, each called Sanitary Squad Units. The Sanitary Squad Unit typically supported a division, or about 10,000 soldiers.

Operations

Deployments

History

References

External links

Military medical organizations of the United States
Ambulance services of World War I